Kotli Khurd is the name of two villages in Pakistan:

Kotli Khurd (Nowshera District)
Kotli Khurd (Mandi Bahauddin District)